Jofroi is a 1934 French drama film directed by Marcel Pagnol and starring Vincent Scotto. It tells the story of a man who has sold his orchard. When the new owner wants to cut the trees down, the former owner threatens with suicide. The film is based on the short story "Jofroi de la Maussan" by Jean Giono, which appears in the collection of his short stories The Solitude of Compassion.

Cast
 Vincent Scotto as Jofroi
 Henri Poupon as Fonse
 Charles Blavette as Antonin
 Odette Roger as Marie
 Annie Toinon as Barbe
 Henri Darbrey as Le notaire
 André Robert as L' instituteur
 José Tyrand as Le curé

References

Bibliography
 Betz, Mark. Beyond the Subtitle: Remapping European Art Cinema. University of Minnesota Press, 2009.

External links
 Jofroi at marcel-pagnol.com

1934 drama films
1934 films
Films based on short fiction
Films based on works by Jean Giono
Films directed by Marcel Pagnol
French drama films
1930s French-language films
French black-and-white films
1930s French films